Kevin Stewart Barker (born July 26, 1975) is an American baseball analyst and former professional baseball player. In his career, he played in Major League Baseball (MLB) as a first baseman for the Milwaukee Brewers, San Diego Padres, Toronto Blue Jays, and Cincinnati Reds. He currently co-hosts the sports talk show Baseball Central alongside Jeff Blair on Sportsnet 590 the FAN, out of Toronto. He began co-hosting Blue Jays Central after Sportsnet parted ways with Gregg Zaun.

Career
Barker is from the small community of Mendota in Washington County, Virginia. He played for three years at John S. Battle High School, before transferring to Virginia High School in Bristol, Virginia as a senior in 1993.

Barker attended Virginia Polytechnic Institute and State University, where he played college baseball for the Virginia Tech Hokies. The Milwaukee Brewers selected Barker in the third round of the 1996 MLB draft. He made his major league debut on August 19, 1999, with the Brewers. He went 2 for 5 in his debut, with his first hit a single to right field off Chris Holt of the Astros. He hit his first Home Run on September 5, 1999 off of Larry Luebbers of the Cardinals. Though the Brewers hoped that Barker would be their long-term first baseman, he was soon surpassed by Richie Sexson. He played in a total of 78 games with the Brewers in 1999 and 2000 and hit .253.

After spending the 2001 season in the minors, the Brewers traded him to the San Diego Padres on March 24, 2002, in exchange for Dusty Wathan. He appeared in only 7 games for the Padres and spent most of the season in AAA with the Portland Beavers.

He spent 2003–2006 in the minor league systems of the Florida Marlins, Philadelphia Phillies and Toronto Blue Jays and was named the International League player of the week in 2006 while playing with the Syracuse SkyChiefs.

He received a September call-up with the Blue Jays and on September 3, 2006, Barker recorded his first hit as a Blue Jay, a home run off Boston Red Sox starting pitcher Josh Beckett. After the 2007 season, Barker signed a minor league contract with the Cincinnati Reds and played for the Triple-A Louisville Bats the entire year. In 2009, he appeared in 29 games for the Reds, batting .281.

He spent the 2010 and 2011 seasons in the Mexican League.

Barker currently co-hosts the sports talk show Baseball Central alongside Jeff Blair on Toronto radio station Sportsnet 590 the FAN.

Personal life
Barker is married to Hazel Mae of Sportsnet.

References

External links
, or Retrosheet

1975 births
Living people
Águilas Cibaeñas players
American expatriate baseball players in the Dominican Republic
Albuquerque Isotopes players
Algodoneros de Guasave players
American expatriate baseball players in Canada
American expatriate baseball players in Mexico
Baseball players from Virginia
Canadian radio sportscasters
Cincinnati Reds players
El Paso Diablos players
Guerreros de Oaxaca players
Huntsville Stars players
Indianapolis Indians players
Louisville Bats players
Louisville Redbirds players
Louisville RiverBats players
Major League Baseball broadcasters
Major League Baseball first basemen
Mexican League baseball first basemen
Milwaukee Brewers players
New Hampshire Fisher Cats players
Ogden Raptors players
People from Bristol, Virginia
Portland Beavers players
Reading Phillies players
Rojos del Águila de Veracruz players
San Diego Padres players
Scranton/Wilkes-Barre Red Barons players
Stockton Ports players
Syracuse Chiefs players
Syracuse SkyChiefs players
Tiburones de La Guaira players
American expatriate baseball players in Venezuela
Toronto Blue Jays announcers
Toronto Blue Jays players
Toros del Este players
Virginia Tech alumni
Virginia Tech Hokies baseball players
Yaquis de Obregón players